

Table of Ranks

See also 
 History of Russian military ranks
 Military Ranks, Special Ranks and Class Rates in Russia
 Prosecutor General of Russia

Military ranks of Russia
Law enforcement in Russia